Gerry Carroll (born 16 July 1958 in Edenderry, County Offaly) is an Irish retired sportsperson.  He played Gaelic football with his local club Edenderry and was a member of the Offaly senior inter-county team from 1977 until 1986.

He later moved to the United States, from where he was interviewed for the documentary Players of the Faithful.

References

1958 births
Living people
Edenderry Gaelic footballers
Offaly inter-county Gaelic footballers
Winners of one All-Ireland medal (Gaelic football)